Bodeker may refer to:
 ST Bodeker or Empire Mead, an Empire ship

People with the surname
Bill Boedeker (1924–2014), American football player
Friedrich Bödeker (1867–1937), German botanist
Ralf Bödeker (born 1958), German footballer